Kochu Thampuratti is a 1979 Indian Malayalam film,  directed by Rochy Alex. Director Rochy Alex, also popularly known as Caramel Alex has produced many television serials in the later 80s with Doordarshan, Trivandram and Chennai. He was survived by wife, two children, a son and a daughter who also got settled in Chennai. Director Alex was soft-spoken, short with medium complexion. The film stars Cochin Haneefa, Sharmila and Vincent in the lead roles. The film has musical score by A. T. Ummer.

Cast
Cochin Haneefa
Sharmila
Vincent

Soundtrack
The music was composed by A. T. Ummer and the lyrics were written by Bharanikkavu Sivakumar.

References

External links
 

1979 films
1970s Malayalam-language films